Iqraar is a 2014 Pakistani drama serial directed by Babar Javed which aired on Geo TV on Tuesday nights at 8:00 p.m. The first episode was aired on 24 October 2014. The serial is written by Sarwat Nazir, produced by A & B Production and  stars Resham, Faisal Qureshi and Maheen Rizvi in lead roles. The story is about a married couple Shahbaz and Shiza, they are living a happy life but Shahbaz marries his rich cousin Hajira whose husband has died which opens a new chapter in the life of Shahbaz and Shiza.

Synopsis 
Drama serial "Iqrar" chronicles the lives of Shahbaz (Faisal Qureshi) and Shiza (Maheen Rizvi), is a perfect couple living in love and harmony. However, things start to take a bitter turn when Shiza finds out about Shahbaz's second marriage to Hajira. Hajira hails from a wealthy family of a village, however after her husband's death she is left alone to safeguard her inherited wealth. Hajira's doubts and fears that her brother in law would harm her and take her money away. To protect Hajira, Shahbaz agrees to marry her as he himself suffers from a series of financial constraints. Appalled by Shahbaz's second marriage, Shiza finds comfort in the presence of her ex-lover Safeer however Safeer further complicates the matter which leaves Shiza with no choice but to return to Shahbaz. Hajira welcomes her with an open heart and Shiza appreciates her kind behaviour. The three of them find their peace with each other but how long will they continue to coexist together?

Cast 

Resham as Hajira
Faysal Qureshi as Shabaaz
Maheen Rizvi as Shiza
Shamoon Abbasi
Qaiser Naqvi as Naila's mother
Umair Leghari
Seemi Pasha
Ali Tabish
Ashan (Child Actor)
Aijaz Aslam (Cameo)

Soundtrack 
The original soundtrack of Iqrar is composed by Waqar Ali and the vocals are provided by Hina Nasrullah.

References

External links 
  Iqraar-A&B Entertainment

2014 Pakistani television series debuts
Geo TV original programming
Pakistani drama television series
Urdu-language television shows